Borthwick Castle is one of the largest and best-preserved surviving medieval Scottish fortifications. It was constructed in 1430 for Sir William Borthwick, from whom the castle takes its name,

Panoramic views of the castle can be seen from the Borders Railway between Edinburgh Waverley and Tweedbank railway stations.

History

The castle was built at the site of an earlier structure, and it remains the Borthwick family ancestral seat. Sir William Borthwick, later the 1st Lord, obtained from King James I on 2 June 1430 a licence to erect on the Mote of Locherwart, a castle or fortalice. This was unusual in Scotland as nobles generally did not need to get permission for the building and fortifying of a Castle. He acquired a large part of Locherworth from his neighbour William Hay who was resentful of this and jealous of his neighbour's castle. The well-preserved medieval effigies of the builder and his lady can be seen in the nearby parish kirk of St Kentigern, which retains a 15th-century aisle also probably built by him.
The design is a 'U-shaped' keep with a  gap between the projecting, slightly asymmetrical, towers. There was a surrounding defensive courtyard with round towers pierced with shot-holes at the corners. While the tower house itself is exceptionally well preserved for its date, the surrounding wall and towers are much restored.

Mary, Queen of Scots visited Borthwick in August 1563 and October 1566. On 15 May 1567 she married James Hepburn, 4th Earl of Bothwell, and in June they came to Borthwick where they were besieged in the castle while under the protection of 6th Lord Borthwick. Mary escaped the siege by disguising herself as a male page.

However, the queen was soon arrested and taken to Lochleven castle where she was held in captivity. Bothwell fled to Orkney and Shetland, and from there escaped to Norway, which at the time was under Danish rule. "The king of Denmark kept him in prison as a useful pawn, first in Malmö, then in Dragsholm on Zealand, where he died insane. His embalmed body is preserved in a crypt in the church at Faarvejle nearby."

In 1650 the Castle was attacked by Oliver Cromwell's forces, and was surrendered after only a few cannon shots. The damage to the walls from this attack is still visible.

After a period of abandonment, the Castle was restored by 1914. During World War II the structure was used as a hiding place to store national treasures. In 1973 it was leased from the Borthwick family and converted into an exclusive hire venue.

In June 2013, the castle closed for extensive refurbishment, and once again opened as an events venue in September 2015.

Building

The castle is on a small hill surrounded by a stream.
Apart from the large cannon scar on one face, the walls, built of fine sandstone ashlar, are virtually complete, and very unusually, none of the original narrow windows have been enlarged. The battlements, however, no longer survive to their original height, having lost their stepped crenelations. They are carried on massive projecting corbels with corner roundels. The tower has two doorways, both unaltered and round headed. One at ground level leads into the partly subterranean kitchen and storage vaults. The second is directly above it at first-floor level, and leads directly into the stone-vaulted great hall. It is approached by a reconstructed stone bridge.

Great Hall
The barrelled Gothic ceiling is painted with pictures of the castle and 'De Temple of Honor' in Gothic characters is visible. The chimney which is also on a large scale is covered by designs.

Ghostlore 
Borthwick castle is the setting for local ghostlore stories, one of which features Mary, Queen of Scots.

Images

References

Bibliography

External links
 
 Overview of Borthwick Castle
 Video about Borthwick Castle's history

Castles in Midlothian
Category A listed buildings in Midlothian
Listed castles in Scotland
Reportedly haunted locations in Scotland